The Central Bank of Paraguay is Paraguay's highest monetary authority, and the country's governing body, in finances and economics.  Its headquarters are in Asunción's Carmelitas neighbourhood. The institution was created by Law 18/52 of March 25, 1952. In 1995, the legal frame of the Central Bank was replaced by Law 489/95.

The bank manages the printing and minting of the Paraguayan currency, the guaraní.

The Bank is active in promoting financial inclusion policy and is a leading member of the Alliance for Financial Inclusion. It is also one of the original 17 regulatory institutions to make specific national commitments to financial inclusion under the Maya Declaration during the 2011 Global Policy Forum held in Mexico.

In 1998, the Bank ordered the liquidation of one of the country's banks due to a severe lack of liquidity.  The government sent emergency legislation to Congress to try to guarantee bank deposits and prevent a run on savings.

In 2005, former Paraguayan president, Luis Gonzales Macchi and four bank officials were jailed following their involvement in the illegal transfer of $16m of funds through the bank to the United States.

Presidents of the Central Bank of Paraguay 
The President is appointed for a term of five years. 
 Juan Ramón Chávez (1952)
 Pedro Juan Mayor (1952), interim
 Epifanio Méndez Fleitas (1952-1954)
 Pedro Mayor (1954), interim
 Osvaldo Chávez (1954)
 Pedro Mayor (1955), interim
 Epifanio Méndez Fleitas (1955)
 Gustavo Storm (1955-1959)
 César Romeo Acosta Martínez (1959-1989)
 Crispiniano Sandoval Silva (1989-1991)
 José Enrique Páez (1991-1993)
 Jacinto Estigarribia (1993-1995)
 Dionisio Coronel Benítez (1995), interim
 Hermes Gómez Ginard (1995-1998)
 Jorge Gulino Ferrari (1998-1999), interim
 Samuel Washington Aswell (1999-2001)
 Raúl Vera Bogado (2001-2002)
 Juan Antonio Ortiz Vely (2002-2003)
 Angel Gabriel González (2003-2005)
 Mónica Pérez (2005-2007)
 Venicio Sánchez Guerreros (2007), interim
 Germán H. Rojas Irigoyen (2007-2008), interim
 Jorge Corvalán (2008-2013)
 Carlos Fernández Valdovinos (2013-2018)
 José Cantero Sienra (2018-)

See also
 Payment system
 Real-time gross settlement

References

External links
  Official site: Central Bank of Paraguay

Economy of Paraguay
Paraguay
Banks of Paraguay
1952 establishments in Paraguay
Banks established in 1952
Paraguayan brands